Vinson Franco Detenamo (born 1954 in Buada) is a Nauruan politician.

Since the 1980s, Detenamo has been a member of the Parliament of Nauru for Buada. He served as the Minister of Interior and Finance.

He served as Minister Assisting the President of Nauru in the cabinets of Kenas Aroi, Bernard Dowiyogo, Ruben Kun and Kinza Clodumar in 1989–1995, 1996 and 1996–1999. He was Minister of Finance under Bernard Dowiyogo from June 1994 to November 1995.

In his role as sports minister, Detenamo was involved in the founding of the Nauru Olympic Committee in 1991 and became the first president of the committee, until Marcus Stephen succeeded him by 2009.

Detenamo was most recently elected to the Nauru parliament for the Buada constituency on 3 May 2003, but was unable to sit down in the early elections on 23 October 2004 and was unseated.

References

1954 births
Living people
Finance Ministers of Nauru
Government ministers of Nauru
Members of the Parliament of Nauru
Ministers Assisting the President of Nauru
20th-century Nauruan politicians
21st-century Nauruan politicians